Alan Reginald Neaves (8 January 1925 – 25 November 2022) was an Australian public servant, lawyer and judge, best known for his role as head of the Attorney-General's Department between 1979 and 1983, and as a Federal Court judge between 1983 and 1995.

Life and career
Neaves was born in January 1925 in the Sydney suburb of Glebe, the son of Ida Florence  and Henry Neaves.

Neaves joined the Attorney-General's Department in 1942. After war service with the Royal Australian Air Force, he graduated in law with first class honours from the University of Sydney in 1948, and was admitted to the New South Wales Bar in 1949.

In December 1974, Neaves was appointed the next Crown Solicitor, to commence in February 1975. The post came after five years in Sydney as head of the Deputy Crown Solicitor's Office.

He was appointed Secretary of the Attorney-General's Department in July 1979.

In 1980 then Prime Minister Malcolm Fraser set up a Royal Commission into the activities of the Painters and Dockers Union, appointing Frank Costigan as Royal Commissioner. The Costigan Commission inquiry period lasted until 1984, and in the process the Attorney-General's Department came under fire from the Labor Party after criticism by the Commission. When the Labor Party was elected and Bob Hawke became Prime Minister, among the new Government's first order of business was to remove Neaves from his position as Secretary of the Attorney-General's Department. He was appointed a judge of the Federal Court on 11 March 1983.

Neaves remained a Judge of the Federal Court until 8 January 1995, when he reached the mandatory retirement age of 70.

References

1925 births
2022 deaths
Judges of the Federal Court of Australia
Secretaries of Australian Government departments
Australian public servants
20th-century Australian public servants
Australian barristers
Royal Australian Air Force personnel of World War II
Sydney Law School alumni